Molinillo may refer to:
Matisia grandifolia, also known as molinillo, a flowering plant from Ecuador
Molinillo, Spain a town in Salamanca Province, Spain
Molinillo (whisk), a traditional Mexican whisk